Flight 2000 is a 1980 Stern widebody pinball machine. It was the first table by this company with speech. The theme of the game revolves around futuristic space flight.

Description
The game has 3-ball multiball where each ball is launched through three separate 'Lift-Off' stages. This is placed at the upper left of the playfield inside a maze-like ball lock mechanism.

The playfield contains a ball capture feature in the upper left and a spinner and drop targets in the middle. Space ships heading to the stars are depicted on the backbox.

Flight 2000 has a robotic synthesised speech sound that fits well to its space travel theme; the voice is the same one that was used in Stern's own Berzerk. Pinball machines with speech were still uncommon in 1980. Xenon was not released by Bally until a couple of months later.

The pinball machine was well received for its combination of attractive art and Harry Williams' innovative design therefore Flight 2000 sold well and is still widely recognized as one of Stern's finest and most memorable games. In Japan, Game Machine listed Flight 2000 on their June 1, 1983 issue as being the third most-successful flipper unit of the month.

Digital versions
Flight 2000 was the winner of a fan poll as the classic Stern table and therefore officially released as a licensed table on The Pinball Arcade for several platforms.

References

External links
 

1980 pinball machines
Stern Electronics pinball machines